New York City's 32nd City Council district is one of 51 districts in the New York City Council. It has been represented by Republican Joann Ariola since 2022. She replaced Eric Ulrich, who was term limited in 2021 and could not seek re-election. Until 2021, it was the only district in the city outside of Staten Island to be represented by a Republican.

Geography
District 32 is based in a geographically splintered set of neighborhoods centered around Jamaica Bay, covering parts of southeastern Queens, the western half of the Rockaways, and the islands in between the two. Communities within the district include Howard Beach, Ozone Park, Belle Harbor, Breezy Point, Broad Channel, Rockaway Park, Neponsit, Roxbury, and parts of South Ozone Park, Richmond Hill, and Woodhaven. Jacob Riis Park, Fort Tilden, Breezy Point Tip, Spring Creek Park, and most of Jamaica Bay Wildlife Refuge are also located within the district.

The district overlaps with Queens Community Boards 9, 10, and 14, and with New York's 5th, 6th, 7th, and 8th congressional districts. It also overlaps with the 10th, 12th, and 15th districts of the New York State Senate, and with the 23rd, 28th, 31st, and 38th districts of the New York State Assembly.

Recent election results

2021
In 2019, voters in New York City approved Ballot Question 1, which implemented ranked-choice voting in all local elections. Under the new system, voters have the option to rank up to five candidates for every local office. Voters whose first-choice candidates fare poorly will have their votes redistributed to other candidates in their ranking until one candidate surpasses the 50 percent threshold. If one candidate surpasses 50 percent in first-choice votes, then ranked-choice tabulations will not occur.

Endorsements

2017

2013

2009

2009 special

Council Members
Parties
 (3)
 (2)

References

New York City Council districts